Trachelipus mostarensis is a species of woodlouse in the genus Trachelipus belonging to the family Trachelipodidae that can be found in Bosnia and Herzegovina and Croatia.

References

External links

Trachelipodidae
Woodlice of Europe
Crustaceans described in 1901